Hassler, Hasler or Hašler may refer to:

Hassler, a German surname and its variants
 Hasler AG a Swiss telecommunications company
Asteroid 37939 Hašler
Hasler Hundred, former hundred in the county of Dorset, England
Hasler Series, British national club championship in the sport of marathon canoeing
Hassler (vessel), 1870 iron-hulled steamship
NOAAS Ferdinand R. Hassler (S 250), 2009 coastal mapping ship